Salinarimonas ramus is a Gram-negative, rod-shaped motile bacterium with a single polar flagellum of the genus Salinarimonas, isolated from crude oil-contaminated saline soil of the Shengli Oilfield in China.

References

External links
Type strain of Salinarimonas ramus at BacDive -  the Bacterial Diversity Metadatabase

Hyphomicrobiales
Bacteria described in 2011